Stockton Deepwater Shipping Channel also called the Baldwin-Stockton Deepwater Shipping Channel or Stockton Deep Water Channel is a manmade deepwater water channel that runs from Suisun Bay and the Sacramento River - Sacramento Deep Water Ship Channel to the Port of Stockton and the Stockton Channel in California. The Stockton Deepwater Shipping Channel is part of the vast Sacramento–San Joaquin River Delta that has a connection to the Pacific Ocean. Stockton Deepwater Shipping Channel is also called the lower San Joaquin River.

History
At the time of the 1849 California Gold Rush ocean steamboats could travel up the San Joaquin River to Fresno. As San Joaquin Valley grew agriculturally and river water was used for crops, the river became shallow. With slower moving water, silt began to build up in the river and it became even shallower. By 1890 the city of Stockton had lost its importance as a seaport. By 1910 the city had created proposals to increase the depth of the lower river by dredging; however, the plans were delayed by World War I. In 1925 the city began a $1.3 million bond campaign dedicated to dredging the lower San Joaquin.
Stockton partnered with the federal and state governments in 1926 to form a $8.2 million fund to change the river to a new channel. In 1928 the river-channel project began. The river was both widened and deepened. To straighten the river, meanders and oxbow lakes were removed. Major straightening cuts were built at Hog Island, Venice Island and Mandeville Island, along with five minor straightening cuts. As silt build-up still continues, major dredging was performed in both 1968 and 1982.

Environmental concern
The slowing of the river-channel has unexpectedly caused low dissolved oxygen levels in the lower San Joaquin River water. The low dissolved oxygen has hurt the fish populations. The three causes are the straightening of the river, pollution from the harbors and cities, and poor tidal mixing.

Baldwin Deepwater Shipping Channel
Baldwin Deepwater Shipping Channel, also called the John F. Baldwin Shipping Channel, runs from the San Francisco Bay through the San Pablo Bay and Suisun Bay to the entrance to the Stockton Ship Channels. Baldwin Deepwater Shipping Channel has a maximum depth of 45 feet and is maintained to 35 feet. The Baldwin Shipping Channel is 600 feet wide. Named after John F. Baldwin Jr., an American military officer and later a U.S. Representative from California. The Carquinez Strait is part of the John F. Baldwin Shipping Channel. Also on the John F. Baldwin Shipping Channel is the: Browns Island, West Island, Winter Island, Broad Slough, New York Slough, Kimball Island, Sherman Island, Sherman Lake, Chipps Island, Mallard Island, Simonons Point, Stake Point, Honker Bay, Roe Island, Port Costa, Port Chicago, Ryer Island, Point Edith, I-680, Bayo Vista, Mococo, Benicia, Interstate 80, Crolona Heights, Point Pinole Regional Shoreline, Richmond, Interstate 580 and Mare Island Naval Shipyard

On Stockton Deepwater Shipping Channel
On the Stockton Deepwater Shipping Channel: 
Suisun Bay  - John F. Baldwin Shipping Channel
 Sacramento River - Sacramento Deep Water Ship Channel
 Dow Wetlands Preserve
 City of Antioch
 Kimbell Island
Antioch Dunes National Wildlife Refuge
 West Island
Antioch Bridge
Sherman Island
 Big Break - Big Break Regional Shoreline
 Bradford Island
 Blind Point
Jersey Island
 Jersey Point
 False River
 Three Mile Slough
 Santa Clara Shoal
 Fisherman's Cut
 Oulton Point
 Libordi Shoals
 San Andreas  Shoals
Mokelumne River
 Webb Point 
 Potato Point - Little Potato Slough 
Bouldin Island
 Old River
 Hayes Point
 Prisoner's Point
 Rindge Tract 
Mandeville Island
 Mandeville Tip County Park
 Mandeville Point
 Mandeville Cut
Venice Island
 Venice Reach
Middle River
 Three River Reach
 Medford Island
 Burns Reach
 Little Potato Slough
 Ward Island
 Ward cut
 Tinsley Island
 White Slough
 Whiskey Slough
 Columbia Cut
Fern Island
 White Slough
Headreach Island
 Tule Island
 Shima Bend
 Haypress Reach
Spud Island
 Hog Island Cut
 Hog Island
 Acker Island
 Turner Cut
 White Slough
 Vulcan Island
 Tenmile Slough
 Riverpiont landing
 Buckley Cove Park
 Burns Cutoff
 Calaveras River
 Stockton Golf and Country Club
 Browns Island
 Smith Channel
 Louis Park
 Atherton Island
Ruff and Ready Island - San Francisco Naval Communication
Port of Stockton
Stockton Channel
City of Stockton
 Upper San Joaquin River

See also
List of rivers of California
San Joaquin River National Wildlife Refuge

References

 
San Joaquin Valley
Stockton Deepwater Shipping Channel
Tributaries of San Pablo Bay
Geography of the San Joaquin Valley
Geography of the San Francisco Bay Area
San Francisco Bay watershed
Shipping channels
Canals in California